Henry Lemoine (21 October 1786 – 18 May 1854) was a French music publisher, composer, and piano teacher.

Life
Lemoine was born in Paris, where he was a pupil of Anton Reicha, a composer and piano teacher.

In 1816 he took over his father Antoine Marcel Lemoine's music publishing business. His father had founded the company in 1772, and it still exists today under the name of Éditions Henry Lemoine. Lemoine was the publisher for Frédéric Chopin, H. Servier, Charlotte Tardieu, and many others. In 1844 he also published Hector Berlioz's Traité d'orchestration. He worked with Ferdinando Carulli to publish a solfège textbook by Adolphe Danhauser called Solfège des Solfèges, which is still in print. In 1850 Lemoine, then blind, turned over his company to his son Achilles Lemoine.

Lemoine's compositions are today generally regarded as unimportant. His piano method and harmony textbook, however, are still of much interest to students of the instrument. He composed a lot of etudes of all levels.

Compositions
Lemoine wrote a number of works of music education (including Études infantines), an extensive collection of piano pieces called Bagatelles and Recreations Musicales. His Méthode et des études de piano is still in use today.

Gandolf on rosebush
Study in A minor
Estudios infantiles para piano, 1866
Solfeo de los solfeos
Etudes enfantines
Solfège des solfèges
Études enfantines pour piano
Il Turco in Italia
Jean de Paris

External links

References

1786 births
1854 deaths
Musicians from Paris
19th-century classical composers
19th-century French composers
French classical composers
French male classical composers
French music publishers (people)
Music publishers (people)
19th-century French male musicians